Charles John Herbert Calow (born 30 September 1931) is a Northern Irish retired footballer who played as a goalkeeper. He made one appearance in the Football League for Bradford Park Avenue.

Career statistics

References

Association footballers from Northern Ireland
NIFL Premiership players
Cliftonville F.C. players
Association football goalkeepers
1931 births
Association footballers from Belfast
Bradford (Park Avenue) A.F.C. players
English Football League players
Lisburn Distillery F.C. players
Northern Ireland amateur international footballers
Living people